Kamel Talhaoui (born 18 March 1971) is an Algerian former sprinter who competed in the 2000 Summer Olympics.

References

1971 births
Living people
Algerian male sprinters
Olympic athletes of Algeria
Athletes (track and field) at the 2000 Summer Olympics
Mediterranean Games gold medalists for Algeria
Mediterranean Games medalists in athletics
Athletes (track and field) at the 1997 Mediterranean Games
21st-century Algerian people
20th-century Algerian people